Montrose Station is a planned station on the Houston METRORail's future University/Blue Line in Houston, Texas, United States. The University/Blue Line will serve the southern portion of the Neartown area as well as the University of St. Thomas.

Content 

https://web.archive.org/web/20100622013029/http://www.gometrorail.org/go/doc/2491/420107/.

References

METRORail stations
Proposed railway stations in the United States
Proposed buildings and structures in Texas